Charles McMahon may refer to:

Charles Alexander McMahon FRS (1830–1904), Anglo-Irish soldier, geologist, and administrator in British India
Charles McMahon (1953–1975), a United States soldier killed in Vietnam: see  Charles McMahon and Darwin Judge
Charlie McMahon (born 1951), an Australian didgeridoo player

See also
Charles MacMahon (disambiguation)
Chuck McMann (1951–2021), Canadian football player